The Zhengding Missionary Murder is an incident in which nine Catholic priests were kidnapped and killed in Zhengding, Hebei province, Republic-era China on October 9, 1937.

Details
During the Sino-Japanese war, troops of the Japanese empire progressed to take in the city of Zhengding. Up to 5,000 local residents sought refuge from the local Bishop, Frans Schraven. Of those 5,000, it is estimated that 200 young women were amongst those seeking refuge, who were thought to be at risk of being abused as comfort women.

The clergymen initially resisted the Japanese troops demands and were later abducted and according to reports burned alive.  Besides Schraven, those who died were Fathers Gerard Wouters and Antoon Gerts (Netherlands), Father Thomas Ceska (Austria with Croatian heritage), Fathers Lucien Charny, Eugene-Antoine Bertrand, André Robial (France), Brother Wladislaw (Poland) and Anton Biskupits (Slovakia). 

The heroic act of the bishop and his priests has led to calls for his beatification and canonisation as patron saint for victims of sexual abuse.

Alternate account

The Nantes France Diplomatic Archives holds an official document dated 13 February 1938, in which the Japanese embassy staff in Beijing, Morishima Morito writes to Francis Lacoste of the French Embassy in Beijing. The document reports the results of an investigation made by the Japanese government and describes the detailed and concrete measures taken by the Japanese army to protect the missionaries. In addition, the document alleges that the crime was committed by Chinese military stragglers, and not by Japanese soldiers. It says "We have not found evidence to overturn the results even after the investigation was continued. Therefore, the Japanese government can not bear the responsibility for the incident."

A Dutch priest entered the locale three days after the incident and recorded the accounts of people there. "A dozen robbers were all wearing a Japanese military uniform. Rather than a regiment hat, they were wearing a felt hat. (snip) They talked that they were Manchus of 'Red Beard', in other words bandits, and wanted the money to go back to the country."

External links 
 Monsignore Frans Schraven Foundation

References

1937 in Christianity
1937 murders in China
Christianity in China